Sufyan Rajab (سفيان رجب) (born 1979) is a Tunisian writer born in Enfidha. He began his career as a poet, moving later on to storytelling.

Career 
Rajab has a number of publications including critique articles, poetry, and novels.

He has published various poems in significant Arab newspapers, in addition to critique articles in the London newspaper The Arabs, the UAE Cultural Magazine and Life's cultural magazine.

Furthermore, he is known to be mentioned in significant files in Tunisian literature, such as in books published by the University of Oregon in 2015, joint books between the National Institute for Translation and the Federation of Italian Writers in 2017, along with files prepared by the Swedish magazine Caravan in 2018.

Moving from poetry to storytelling, The Liberal Monkey (2017) was his first novel, following up with his second one, The American Shoe Factory (2021), which discusses terrorism and the adaptation of new ruling systems

Additionally, his short story collection, The Last Hour (2018), was shortlisted for the Form Story Award 2019 in Kuwait.

List of Publications

Awards  
Rajab won various local and Arab poetry awards, including: 

 2007 Moufdi Zakaria Award (Algeria)
 2009 Tanga's Award for Poetry
 2018 Afifi Mattar Award for his collection of poetries, The Air Postman

See also 
Storytelling
Poetry

References 

1979 births
Living people
21st-century Tunisian poets
People from Sousse Governorate
Tunisian male short story writers
Tunisian short story writers